Budkov is a municipality and village in Třebíč District in the Vysočina Region of the Czech Republic. It has about 300 inhabitants.

Notable people
Pavel Posád (born 1953), Roman Catholic bishop

References

Villages in Třebíč District